This is a complete list of albums released under B2M Entertainment. It is organized by year of release date and in chronological order.

2010

2011

2012

2013

2014

2015

2016

References
 B2M Entertainment official page
 B2M Entertainment on YouTube

Discographies of South Korean record labels
K-pop discographies